Sandy Gore (born 28 June 1950) is an Australian film, stage and television actress. She has had an extensive stage career in Australia with the Melbourne Theatre Company and Sydney Theatre Company including playing Vivian in Wit (2000) and Maria in Uncle Vanya (2010), reprising the latter role in New York in 2012.

Career
On television, Gore appeared in the hit series Prisoner in 1980, as Kay White, the payroll-embezzling accountant who met a sticky end when her gambling addiction gets the better of her. Also, she has starred as Mother Ambrose in the 1991 mini-series Brides of Christ and had guest roles in TV series such as Grass Roots and Farscape. She played Heckla in the 1992 children's sci-fi series Halfway Across the Galaxy and Turn Left. She also appeared as Anja in Paws and as a guest role in Rafferty's Rules.

She was nominated three times for the Australian Film Institute Award (now AACTA Awards) for Best Supporting Actress, for her work in the Australian films Norman Loves Rose (1982), Undercover (1983) and Street Hero (1984). She also appeared in A Cry in the Dark (1988), Lorenzo's Oil (1992) and in the epic film Australia (2008)

Gore has worked extensively with the Melbourne Theatre Company and the Sydney Theatre Company. Her stage roles include an acclaimed performance in the play Wit in 2000.  She played Baptista in the 2009 Australian tour of The Taming of the Shrew with the Bell Shakespeare Company, while in 2010, she was cast as Maria in the Sydney theatre company production of Chekhov's Uncle Vanya, alongside Cate Blanchett and Richard Roxburgh and reprised the role in 2012, when it transferred to New York at the New York City Center theatre.

Filmography

FILM

TELEVISION

References

External links

1950 births
Australian film actresses
Australian stage actresses
Australian television actresses
Living people